Neil Griffiths is a British novelist, and the founder of the Republic of Consciousness Prize for Small Presses. He is the winner of the Authors' Club First Novel Award, and has been shortlisted for best novel in the Costa Book Awards.

Early life
Neil Griffiths was born in south London, and grew up in "various places in the South East of England".

Career
Griffiths has worked in television, and has written for BBC Radio 4.

His first novel, Betrayal in Naples, won the Authors' Club First Novel Award, and Saving Caravaggio was shortlisted for the best novel in the Costa Book Awards (formerly the Whitbread Prize).

In 2016, Griffiths launched the Republic of Consciousness Prize for Small Presses, to celebrate "small presses producing brilliant and brave literary fiction" in the UK and Ireland, with £2,000 of his own money, and he is hoping other authors will add to this, to get the prize up to about £10,000. The Prize has received support from the 
Times Literary Supplement, and funding from the Arts Council, and the winner will receive at least £5,000, and all shortlisted books £1,000. The longlist was announced in December 2017.

Until 2016, Griffiths himself had been published by Penguin, a large publisher, and announced that his next novel, As a God Might Be (then provisionally called Family of Love), would be placed with a small publisher - it was published by Dodo Ink in 2017. In 2017, a passage from As a God Might Be made the shortlist for the Literary Review Bad Sex in Fiction Award.

Griffiths blogs on literary matters for The Guardian.

Selected publications
Betrayal in Naples (Penguin, London, 2004)
Saving Caravaggio (Penguin, London, 2006)
As a God Might Be (Dodo Ink, 2017)

Personal life
He lives in London.

References

External links
 Guardian profile
 Literary agent's website

21st-century British novelists
Living people
British male novelists
Writers from London
21st-century English male writers
Year of birth missing (living people)